MPLAB is a proprietary freeware integrated development environment for the development of embedded applications on PIC and dsPIC microcontrollers, and is developed by Microchip Technology.

MPLAB X is the latest edition of MPLAB, and is developed on the NetBeans platform. MPLAB and MPLAB X support project management, code editing, debugging and programming of Microchip 8-bit PIC and AVR (including ATMEGA) microcontrollers, 16-bit PIC24 and dsPIC microcontrollers, as well as 32-bit SAM (ARM) and PIC32 (MIPS) microcontrollers.

MPLAB is designed to work with MPLAB-certified devices such as the MPLAB ICD 3 and MPLAB REAL ICE, for programming and debugging PIC microcontrollers using a personal computer. PICKit programmers are also supported by MPLAB.

MPLAB X supports automatic code generation with the MPLAB Code Configurator and the MPLAB Harmony Configurator plugins.

MPLAB X 

MPLAB X is the latest version of the MPLAB IDE built by Microchip Technology, and is based on the open-source NetBeans platform. MPLAB X supports editing, debugging and programming of Microchip 8-bit, 16-bit and 32-bit PIC microcontrollers.

MPLAB X is the first version of the IDE to include cross-platform support for macOS and Linux operating systems, in addition to Microsoft Windows.

MPLAB X supports the following compilers:
MPLAB XC8 — C compiler for 8-bit PIC and AVR devices
MPLAB XC16 — C compiler for 16-bit PIC devices
MPLAB XC32 — C/C++ compiler for 32-bit MIPS-based PIC32 and ARM-based SAM devices 
HI-TECH C — C compiler for 8-bit PIC devices (discontinued)
SDCC — open-source C compiler

MPLAB 8.x 

MPLAB 8.x is the last version of the legacy MPLAB IDE technology, custom built by Microchip Technology in Microsoft Visual C++. MPLAB supports project management, editing, debugging and programming of Microchip 8-bit, 16-bit and 32-bit PIC microcontrollers. MPLAB only works on Microsoft Windows. MPLAB is still available from Microchip's archives, but is not recommended for new projects.

MPLAB supports the following compilers:

MPLAB MPASM Assembler
MPLAB ASM30 Assembler
MPLAB C Compiler for PIC18
MPLAB C Compiler for PIC24 and dsPIC DSCs
MPLAB C Compiler for PIC32
HI-TECH C

References

External links 
 Microchip MPLAB Website

Embedded systems